Condon is a lunar impact crater that lies on the eastern shore of the Sinus Successus, a bay along the northeast edge of Mare Fecunditatis. It was named after American physicist Edward U. Condon. It lies midway between the larger crater Apollonius to the north and the smaller Webb to the south on the Mare Fecunditatis. Condon was previously designated Webb R.

This is a lava-flooded crater remnant with only low rim segments surviving to the east and west. There is a break in the rim to the south and a wider break to the northwest of the crater. The crater interior is nearly level, and mark only by a few low rises in the surface.

References

External links

 LTO-62C4 Condon — L&PI topographic map

Impact craters on the Moon